Ivan Frankie Franjic (born 10 September 1987) is an Australian soccer player who plays for Melbourne Knights in the NPL Victoria.

Club career

Victorian Premier League
Franjic played at Junior level for Meadow Park Eagles, Melbourne Knights, and St Albans Saints. During the 2005 season he made his senior debut for the Saints, playing 39 times for a reward of five goals. He then moved back to his former Youth club Melbourne Knights where he played 50 times, scoring nine goals. After the 2008 season he moved to Oakleigh Cannons where his performances would soon earn him a move to the A-League with Brisbane Roar. Due to the Victorian Premier League being a semi-professional league, Franjic also was employed as a Carpenter.

Brisbane Roar
On 31 August 2009, he was signed as a short-term injury replacement for Andrew Packer. After being signed on loan to Brisbane he was signed on a long term contract. During his first season in the A-League he made a combined 20 appearances for the club.

Franjic scored his first goal for Brisbane in a pre-season friendly against the Newcastle Jets on 2 July 2010.  His 85th-minute penalty was the match-winning goal, with the Roar winning 1–0.  His first A-League goal for Brisbane came in the Round 10, midweek clash with Central Coast Mariners at Suncorp Stadium with a powerful volley from outside of the box. His goal was made famous for his team's "human kayak" celebration.  Brisbane won the game 2–0. Playing as a wingback, Franjic impressed at the Roar.

In Round 17, Franjic scored an equalising goal against the North Queensland Fury in the 85th minute.  The game ended 1–1.  This goal meant that the Roar continued their undefeated run, extending it to 12 matches. Franjic played at right-back for the Brisbane Roar in the 2011 A-League Grand Final.  The Roar were down 2–0 in extra time against the Central Coast Mariners before scoring two goals in under four minutes to send the match to a penalty shoot-out. Franjic scored the first penalty for the Roar who ended up winning 4–2 in the shootout after two saves from Michael Theoklitos.

Franjic was one of six Brisbane Roar players to be selected in the All-Star Team for the 2010–11 season. Goal.com named Franjic as one of five Australian defenders in the A-League who are ready to play in Europe.

In 2012, Franjic played in the 2012 A-League Grand Final against Perth Glory, where he scored an own goal to give Perth an unlikely lead. Brisbane managed to claw back and take the lead courtesy a late penalty by Besart Berisha, becoming the first A-League side to win the championship two years in succession.

Torpedo Moscow
In August 2014, Franjic moved to newly promoted Russian Premier League side FC Torpedo Moscow, signing a three-year contract at the club. Franjic made his debut for Torpedo on 25 October 2014, in a 0–0 home draw against FC Kuban Krasnodar, coming on as a half-time substitute for Ivan Novoseltsev. During January 2015 Torpedo blocked a loan move for Franjic back to the A-League, with Franjic later being linked with a move to Dinamo Zagreb during the summer of 2015. He quit Torpedo Moscow due to unpaid wages on 23 April 2015.

Melbourne City
Just over a month after leaving Russia, Franjic was unveiled as A-League side Melbourne City's first signing of the summer. Signing a three-year deal, Franjic expressed his pleasure at returning to his home town, and cited the prospect of first team football as a key factor in his decision to join City, particularly in light of his desire to retain his place in the Socceroos starting line-up.

Daegu FC
After two injury-plagued seasons at Melbourne City, Franjic was released from the third year of his contract to allow him to join South Korean club Daegu FC. Franjic announced that he was leaving the club in October 2017, having made just two K League Classic appearances.

Return to Brisbane Roar
Franjic returned to Brisbane Roar on a one-season contract in November 2017. On his second appearance for Brisbane Roar after joining he scored a left foot curled effort after two minutes on the pitch to claim a 2–0 win over Western Sydney Wanderers. At the end of the season, he refused Brisbane Roar's offer to re-sign him.

Perth Glory
On 31 May 2018, following his release from Brisbane Roar, Franjic signed for fellow A-League club, Perth Glory on a two-year deal.

Macarthur
In September 2020, Franjic signed with Macarthur for their inaugural season.

Return to Melbourne Knights
On 3 November 2022, Franjic and his brother Joseph agreed to join Melbourne Knights for the 2023 season.

International career
In December 2012, Franjic made his international debut for the Socceroos under Holger Osieck.

In the 2014 FIFA World Cup in Brazil he started at right back in Australia's 3–1 loss to Chile. At the 35th minute he crossed to Tim Cahill who scored Australia's only goal in the game. Franjic later succumbed to a hamstring injury and was substituted in the second half. He was later ruled out of the remainder of the tournament to his bitter disappointment.

Franjic was named as part of Australia's squad for the 2015 AFC Asian Cup. Franjic started in Australia's first match of the tournament against Kuwait, playing the full 90 minutes and providing the assist for Massimo Luongo to score Australia's second goal of the match.

Franjic started for Australia in the 2015 AFC Asian Cup Final. However, after suffering an injury in the middle of the second half, Franjic was substituted off for Matt McKay as Australia won 2–1.

Away from football, Franjic was completing a carpentry apprenticeship before deciding to pursue a professional football career.

Career statistics

Honours

Club
Brisbane Roar
 A-League Premiership: 2010–11, 2013–14
 A-League Championship: 2010–11, 2011–12, 2013–14

Melbourne City
 FFA Cup: 2016

Perth Glory
 A-League: Premiers 2018–19

International
Australia
 AFC Asian Cup: 2015

Individual
 PFA A-League Team of the Season: 2010–11, 2013–14
 PFA A-League Team of the Decade: 2005–15

References

External links
 Brisbane Roar profile
 

1987 births
Soccer players from Melbourne
Australian people of Croatian descent
Living people
Australian soccer players
Australia international soccer players
Association football fullbacks
St Albans Saints SC players
Melbourne Knights FC players
Brisbane Roar FC players
Oakleigh Cannons FC players
FC Torpedo Moscow players
Melbourne City FC players
Daegu FC players
Perth Glory FC players
Macarthur FC players
Heidelberg United FC players
A-League Men players
Russian Premier League players
K League 1 players
National Premier Leagues players
2014 FIFA World Cup players
2015 AFC Asian Cup players
AFC Asian Cup-winning players
Australian expatriate soccer players
Expatriate footballers in Russia
Australian expatriate sportspeople in Russia
Expatriate footballers in South Korea
Australian expatriate sportspeople in South Korea